Hypixel, officially the Hypixel Network, is a Minecraft minigame server released on April 13, 2013, by Simon "Hypixel" Collins-Laflamme and Philippe Touchette, and is managed and run by Hypixel Inc. Hypixel is only available on the Java Edition of Minecraft, but was formerly available on the Bedrock Edition of the game as well. Hypixel has held four Guinness World Records and is widely considered to be the largest currently active Minecraft server.

History 
The Hypixel server was released in beta on April 13, 2013, by Simon Collins-Laflamme, and Philippe Touchette. The server is managed and run by Hypixel Inc. The two originally created Minecraft adventure maps together and uploaded trailers to their YouTube channel. The Hypixel server was created to play and further showcase these maps. Minigames were originally created for users to play on while waiting for other players, but the minigames themselves gained popularity on their own and became the server's main identity, and efforts from Hypixel were put towards new server content instead of the making of other Minecraft maps and games.

Hypixel Inc., Hypixel's maintainer, was registered as a Canadian corporation under the name "8414483 Canada Inc" on January 23, 2013. Its name was then modified to "Hypixel Inc." on February 2, 2015.

In 2015, it was revealed that the server cost around $100,000 a month to maintain.

As of April 2021, the server regularly reaches over 150,000 concurrent players, peaking at over 216,000 on April 16. On December 21, 2016, Hypixel reached 10 million unique players in total, and had reached 14.1 million unique players by the time Hytale was announced on December 13, 2018. The server reached 18 million unique players in April 2020, according to a tweet by the server owner. , Hypixel attracts 1.9 million players every month.

Hypixel China 
In May 2017, Hypixel partnered with NetEase, the publisher of Minecraft China, to release a version of Hypixel in China, sometimes known as "Chypixel". This separate version of Minecraft and the Hypixel Minecraft server would be operated and translated by NetEase, as part of their partnership.

On April 13, 2020, due to the expiration of their agreement, NetEase announced that the Chinese version of the server would be shutting down on June 30, 2020.

Attacks 

Around April 2018, Hypixel began to use Cloudflare Spectrum as a DDoS protection after being the victim of multiple attacks hosted by Mirai, a malware, against the server.

On 18 June 2021, Hypixel shut down for emergency maintenance, stating their host was under "large-scale DDoS attacks". Connection problems were reported by players before the server was shut down, and the Hypixel team had claimed to have "identified the issue with an upstream provider". The server subsequently remained closed for four days before fully reopening.  In its statement, the Hypixel team re-iterated that they had "dealt with DDoS attacks for well over 8 years", and that "recent changes at [their] host caused a flaw in [their] setup".

Gameplay 
Hypixel has various multiplayer minigames created by modifying and repurposing the game mechanics of Minecraft. Its players can purchase cosmetics and ranks that allow for certain in-game abilities.

Guinness World Records 
On October 20, 2017, Hypixel announced that they held four Guinness World Records.

See also 
 Hytale, an upcoming video game by Hypixel Studios
 Technoblade

References

External links 

 Official website

Minecraft servers
Internet properties established in 2013